Zakaria Sherif Zaki (born January 18, 1990) commonly known as Zeeko Zaki, is an Egyptian-born American actor best known for his role portraying Special Agent Omar Adom "O. A." Zidan on Dick Wolf's FBI.

Early life 
Zaki was born in Alexandria, Egypt, and emigrated with his parents Emon and Sherif Zaki to the United States at one month of age. Zaki's maternal grandparents emigrated to the US before he and his parents arrived. His extended family remained in Egypt. During his childhood Zaki spent summers in his hometown and his aunt has a villa in Agami Region where he and his relatives gather. He grew up in West Chester, Pennsylvania. His mother manages a salon in Wilmington, Delaware and his father is a stylist. Zaki has two younger siblings, a brother, Zeyad and a sister, Zeina.

Career 
He discovered a passion for acting during his freshman year high school performance of Seussical at Unionville High School; he graduated from Unionville High School. He also acted in the community theatre group Unionville Players. He briefly attended Temple University.

In 2010 Zaki moved to North Carolina working in theater before auditioning for television roles. He appeared in bit part roles in various films and television series before landing recurring roles in Six and 24: Legacy, portraying antagonists, and in Valor, in which he portrayed a door gunner of a U.S. Army special operations aviation unit. Zaki was cast in his first lead role playing Agent Zidan in Dick Wolf's procedural show FBI. The role was originally written for a Latino actor but Wolf was impressed by Zaki's audition tape and changed the character's ethnicity to mirror Zaki's background.

Zaki said that he wants to prove to the world that Muslims and Arabs aren't terrorists as is commonly believed.

Personal life 
Zaki is a Muslim and he spoke Egyptian Arabic at home until the age of six.

Filmography

Television

Film

References

External links 
 

People from Alexandria 
Egyptian male television actors
1990 births
American male television actors
Living people
Temple University alumni
American male actors 
American Muslims
Egyptian emigrants to the United States
American people of Egyptian descent